The 1919 Wyoming Cowboys football team was an American football team that represented the University of Wyoming as a member of the Rocky Mountain Conference (RMC) during the 1919 college football season. In their fourth season under head coach John Corbett, the Cowboys compiled a 3–5 record (3–3 against conference opponents), finished fifth in the RMC, and were outscored by a total of 115 to 68. Andrew W. Willis was the team captain.

Schedule

References

Wyoming
Wyoming Cowboys football seasons
Wyoming Cowboys football